The Gran Premio di Lugano is a road bicycle race held annually in Lugano, Switzerland. Prior to 1981 it was held as an individual time trial but in recent years it has been organised as a 1.1 event on the UCI Europe Tour. In 2013, the race was cancelled due to snowfall.

Lugano, Chrono

GP di Lugano

References

External links
  

 
UCI Europe Tour races
Cycle races in Switzerland
Recurring sporting events established in 1981
1981 establishments in Switzerland
Spring (season) events in Switzerland